{{DISPLAYTITLE:C10H14ClN}}
The molecular formula C10H14ClN may refer to:

 para-Chloromethamphetamine
 3-Chloromethamphetamine
 4-Chlorophenylisobutylamine
 Chlorphentermine
 Clortermine
 N,N-Dimethyl-2-chloro-2-phenylethylamine
 N-Ethyl-N-(2-chloroethyl)aniline